The Honaz Tunnel is a road tunnel, located in Denizli, Turkey. The tunnel was opened to traffic on 28 January 2023 by the Turkish president Recep Tayyip Erdoğan.

References

Road tunnels in Turkey
Buildings and structures in Denizli
Pamukkale District
Honaz District
Tunnels in Turkey